The Lithuanian Citizens' Alliance (LPA) was a political party in Lithuania.

History
The party was established on 29 July 1996, and was originally known as the Alliance of the Lithuanian Minorities (Lietuvos tautinių mažumų aljansas). In the 1996 parliamentary elections it received 2.55% of the vote, and initially failed to win a seat. Shortly after the elections, the party was renamed the Lithuanian Citizens' Alliance. In by-elections that were held the following year in four constituencies where turnout had been below the threshold to validate the results of the 1996 elections, the party won a seat, with Mečislav Vaškovič elected from the Naujoji Vilnia constituency.

In the 1997 municipal elections the party's best performance came in Vilnius (where Juozas Raistenskis became deputy mayor) and Visaginas. Between 1999 and 2000 many party members (including Raistenskis) joined the Liberal Union of Lithuania. In the 2000 municipal elections the party won three seats in Visaginas.

In 2005 the party was renamed the Lithuanian Citizens Union (Lietuvos piliečių sąjunga), and was subsequently transformed into the Civic Democratic Party the following year.

References

Defunct political parties in Lithuania
1996 establishments in Lithuania
2006 disestablishments in Lithuania
Political parties established in 1996
Political parties disestablished in 2006
Political parties of minorities